Jussi Pelli (born 4 November 1954) is a Finnish modern pentathlete and épée fencer. He fenced at the 1976 Summer Olympics and competed in the modern pentathlon at the 1976, 1980 and 1984 Summer Olympics.

Pelli won the Finnish modern pentathlon championship in 1977 and 1981. He won the Finnish men's team pentathlon championship in 1976, 1981 and 1982.

References

External links
 

1954 births
Living people
Finnish male épée fencers
Finnish male modern pentathletes
Olympic fencers of Finland
Olympic modern pentathletes of Finland
Fencers at the 1976 Summer Olympics
Modern pentathletes at the 1976 Summer Olympics
Modern pentathletes at the 1980 Summer Olympics
Modern pentathletes at the 1984 Summer Olympics
Sportspeople from Helsinki